Lowri Thomas (born 3 March 1999) is a British and Welsh track cyclist.

Cycling career
Thomas became a British Champion when winning the team sprint event at the 2022 British National Track Championships alongside teammates Emma Finucane and Rhian Edmunds. In April 2022, Thomas, Finucane and Edmunds once again combined to win a bronze medal in the team sprint in round one of the 2022 UCI Nations Cup in Glasgow, setting a new British record in the process. The trio then went on to win bronze in the team sprint at the 2022 Commonwealth Games. The Welsh team outperformed all the other home nations, and beating Australia in the Bronze medal ride off, to take third spot on the podium behind New Zealand and Canada.

Major results
2022
National Track Championships
1st  Team sprint
UCI Nations Cup
3rd  Team sprint (Round 1, Glasgow)
Commonwealth Games
3rd  Team sprint (with Emma Finucane and Rhian Edmunds)

References

Living people
1999 births
British female cyclists
British track cyclists
Welsh track cyclists
Welsh female cyclists
Cyclists at the 2022 Commonwealth Games
Commonwealth Games competitors for Wales
Commonwealth Games medallists in cycling
Commonwealth Games bronze medallists for Wales
Medallists at the 2022 Commonwealth Games